Slievelamagan is a mountain in County Down, Northern Ireland. It is part of the Mourne Mountains.

See also 

Lists of mountains in Ireland
List of mountains of the British Isles by height
List of Marilyns in the British Isles
List of Hewitt mountains in England, Wales and Ireland

References

Hewitts of Northern Ireland
Marilyns of Northern Ireland
Mountains and hills of County Down
Mountains under 1000 metres